Manufactured in Italy just prior to World War I, the Aetos was powered by a 492cc 3.5 hp V-twin engine.

See also 

List of Italian companies
List of motorcycle manufacturers

References

Defunct motor vehicle manufacturers of Italy
Defunct motorcycle manufacturers of Italy